The squatter pigeon (Geophaps scripta) is a species of bird in the family Columbidae.
It is endemic to northeastern Australia.
According to Australia's then Department of the Environment and Energy, the nominate subspecies, southern squatter pigeon (Geophapa scripta scripta) is listed as vulnerable. It lives in arid and semi-arid areas, including grasslands and dry sclerophyll forests.

The squatter pigeon is identifiable by its distinctive markings; it has black and white facial markings and a white stripe up each of its sides.

References

squatter pigeon
Birds of Queensland
Endemic birds of Australia
squatter pigeon
squatter pigeon
Taxonomy articles created by Polbot

a